Berinda is a genus of ground spiders that was first described by Carl Friedrich Roewer in 1928.

Species
 it contains seven species in Mediterranean Europe and the near East:
Berinda aegilia Chatzaki, 2002 – Greece
Berinda amabilis Roewer, 1928 (type) – Greece (Crete)
Berinda cooki Logunov, 2012 – Turkey
Berinda cypria Chatzaki & Panayiotou, 2010 – Cyprus
Berinda ensigera (O. Pickard-Cambridge, 1874) – Greece (incl. Crete), Turkey
Berinda hakani Chatzaki & Seyyar, 2010 – Turkey
Berinda idae Lissner, 2016 – Greece

References

Araneomorphae genera
Gnaphosidae
Spiders of Asia
Taxa named by Carl Friedrich Roewer